Charadrus or Charadrous was an ancient Greek city of the Acte headland of Chalcidice noted in the Periplus of Pseudo-Scylax The name has also come down to us in the form Charadriae (Χαραδρίαι). 

Its site is unlocated.

References

Cities in ancient Macedonia
Populated places in ancient Macedonia
Greek colonies in Chalcidice
Former populated places in Greece
Ancient Athos
Lost ancient cities and towns